Leandro Ezquerra full name Leandro Ezquerra de León (born June 5, 1986, in Montevideo, Uruguay), is a Uruguayan footballer. He plays for Club Atlético Torque of the Uruguayan Primera División.

Career
He has been playing in River Plate since 2004. In 2004, he obtained the title for Uruguayan Second Division as his team got the promotion needed to play in First Division.

During 2005 He took part in Uruguay National Team U-20 and played in the South American U-20 Championship held in Colombia on the same year.

References

External links

1986 births
Living people
Uruguayan footballers
Uruguayan expatriate footballers
Racing Club de Montevideo players
Club Atlético River Plate (Montevideo) players
Defensor Sporting players
El Tanque Sisley players
C.D. Huachipato footballers
Grêmio Esportivo Brasil players
Juventud de Las Piedras players
Centro Atlético Fénix players
Uruguayan Primera División players
Chilean Primera División players
Montevideo City Torque players
Expatriate footballers in Chile
Expatriate footballers in Brazil
Expatriate footballers in Venezuela
Association football midfielders